Trautmannsdorf an der Leitha is a town in the district of Bruck an der Leitha in Lower Austria in Austria.

Geography
Trautmannsdorf an der Leitha lies in the industrial area of Lower Austrica. The Leitha River crosses the municipality. It is the third-largest municipality of the district. About 9.56 percent of the municipality is forested.

The municipality contains the following villages:
 Gallbrunn (population 736 as of 1 January 2017)
 Sarasdorf (population 568 as of 1 January 2017)
 Stixneusiedl (population 580 as of 1 January 2017)
 Trautmannsdorf an der Leitha (population 979 as of 1 January 2017)

References

Cities and towns in Bruck an der Leitha District
Populated places on the Leitha